Revue Noire is a specialist publisher of books and web material relating to African contemporary art and culture, based in France. From 1991 to 2001, Editions Revue Noire published the printed quarterly magazine Revue Noire. Since 2001 it has specialized in books, exhibitions, and online content.

History 
Revue Noire was created in 1991 in Paris with the objective of demonstrating that "there is art in Africa". The name relates to the Revue Blanche, a French magazine of the Fifties, to Josephine Baker and to Paris of the Thirties when there was a discussion about "revues nègres".

The magazine was founded by Jean Loup Pivin, Simon Njami, Bruno Tilliette and Pascal Martin Saint Léon; over time the editorial board has also included Pierre Gaudibert, Jacques Soulillou, André Magnin (only for the first issue), Francisco d'Almeida, Everlyn Nicodemus, N'Goné Fall (editor assistant in 1994 and chief editor in 1999), Clémentine Deliss, Etienne Féau and Isabelle Boni-Claverie. The contributors to the magazine change according to the theme and the country on which the magazine focusses; Yacouba Konaté and Brahim Alaoui have been among the collaborators.

Between 1991 and 2001 the magazine published 34 issues. In 2001 Revue Noire was continued as a publishing house and online magazine, but it stopped its paper quarterly publication. In 2010 a new editorial project was launched.

Revue Noire is a magazine but also a publishing house, a production company for documentary films, short films, videos, and music. Some issues of the magazine include music CDs, exhibitions and events. In particular its two anthologies on contemporary African art and on contemporary African photography are major publications in the field.

Notes

Bibliography 
 Lucy Durán (ed.), Africa Remix: Contemporary Art of a Continent (Johannesburg: Jacana Media, 2007), p. 249.
 Paula Youngman Skreslet, Northern Africa: A Guide to Reference and Information Sources (Englewood: Libraries Unlimited, 2000), p. 199.
 Revue Noire. La testimonianza di N'Goné Fall (a cura di Irene Amodei e Iolanda Pensa) in "Africa e Mediterraneo", n. 55, Agosto 2006, p. 13-16.
 Sarah Nuttall, Beautiful/ugly: African and Diaspora Aesthetics, Duke University Press, 2006, p. 12.
 Thomas Boutoux e Cédric Vincent, "Africa Remix" Sampler in Africa Remix: L'art contemporain d'un continent. Exposition présentée au Centre Pompidou, Galerie 1, du 25 mai au 8 août 2005, Paris, Editions du Centre Pompidou, 2005, p. 277.
 Jean-Loup Amselle. L'art de la friche: Essai sur l'art africain contemporain, Editions Flammarion, Paris, 2005; ed. italiana L'arte africana contemporanea, Bollati Boringhieri, Torino, 2007, pp. 145–149.

External links 
Revue Noire web-site

1991 establishments in France
Contemporary art magazines
French-language magazines
Magazines established in 1991
Magazines published in Paris
Publishing companies of France